Ronny Greetje Bierman  (12 July 1938 – 3 February 1984) was a Dutch film and television actress.

Bierman is known for her role in Diary of a Hooker (1971).

Ronny Bierman was born in Amsterdam on 12 July 1938. She died in Amsterdam on 3 February 1984. Bierman never got married.

Filmography
Business Is Business (1971)
Kapsalon (1972)
The Burglar (1972)
Living Apart Together (1973)
Happy Days Are Here Again (1975)
Blood Relations (1977)
Quitte of Dubbel (1977) (TV film)
De Mantel der Liefde (1978)

External links

1938 births
1984 deaths
Dutch film actresses
Dutch television actresses
Actresses from Amsterdam
20th-century Dutch actresses